Canelo Álvarez vs. Ryan Rhodes was a super welterweight championship fight for the WBC super welterweight championship. The bout was held on June 18, 2011, at Arena VFG in Guadalajara, Jalisco, Mexico and was televised on HBO.

Build up
This was the first title defence for Mexican, Canelo Álvarez. Harold Lederman, HBO's unofficial ringside judge called the Litzau and Broner bout with Bob Papa. Roy Jones Jr. was pulled from that fight and was back on for the main-event, because his promotional company has a relationship with Litzau.

Main card
Super welterweight championship  Canelo Álvarez vs.  Ryan Rhodes
Álvarez defeated Rhodes via technical knockout at 0:48 in the twelve round.
Super featherweight bout:  Jason Litzau vs.  Adrien Broner
Broner defeated Litzau via technical knockout at 2:58 in the first round.

Preliminary card
Featherweight bout:  Sergio Villanueva vs.  Onalvi Sierra
Villanueva defeated Sierra via unanimous decision.
Super featherweight bout:  José Manuel Osório vs.  Alexander Monterrosa
Osório defeated Monterrosa via technical knockout.
Light heavyweight bout:  Marco Antonio Periban vs.  Alfredo Contreras
Periban defeated Contreras via unanimous decision.
Light welterweight bout:  Carlos Pérez vs.  Cesar Figueroa
Figueroa defeated Pérez via technical knockout in the second round.
Flyweight bout:  Jesús Jiménez vs.  Patricio Camacho
Jiménez defeated Camacho via knockout at 1:18 in the third round.
Featherweight bout:  Gary Buckland vs.  Jose Roberto Gonzalez	
Buckland defeated Gonzalez via unanimous decision.

References

External links
Álvarez vs. Rhodes Official Fight Card from BoxRec
HBO Sports

Rhodes
2011 in boxing
Boxing in Mexico
Sport in Guadalajara, Jalisco
2011 in Mexican sports
Boxing on HBO
Golden Boy Promotions
June 2011 sports events in Mexico
21st century in Guadalajara, Jalisco